The Blanca Wetlands  Area of Critical Environmental Concern, or Blanca Wildlife Habitat Area, is an area of the San Luis Valley in Colorado, United States, that serves as a refuge for birds, fish and other wildlife.
The wetlands had been completely destroyed by pumping and diversion of water for irrigation.  Starting in 1965 the Bureau of Land Management began to restore them,
and they have become an increasingly important ecological habitat for shorebirds, waterbirds and other wildlife and native plants.

Location

The region has a cool, dry climate, with about 107 frost-free days each year.
The landscape is flat. Sand dunes carry sparse vegetation such as  greasewood, rubber rabbit, salt grass, sandhill muhly and sand dropseed. The areas of dunes are intermingled with depressions and basins of historical playas.
Loss of water and destruction of wetlands occurred in the twentieth century due to pumping and redirecting surface water for irrigation.
By the mid-1900s the basins had completely dried up, and the area became known as "Dry Lakes".

In 1965 the San Luis Resource Area of the Bureau of Land Management began a project to restore some of the dry playas in the San Luis Valley to their former condition as wetlands.
In contains about two hundred shallow basins floored by layers of sand and clay, holding wet meadows, salt flats, marshes and fresh water ponds.
As of 1989 the Habitat Area contained  of pond and wetlands, with another  of historical wetlands to be developed

Wetland vegetation in the playas includes softstem bulrush, cattail, alkaline bulrush, spike rush, sago pondweed, longleaf pondweed and watermilfoil.
About  are watered each year, while other parts are deliberately allowed to dry up.

Administration

The Blanca Wildlife Habitat Area has been designated as an official mitigation site for wetland losses that have been caused by construction and operation of the Closed Basin Project by the Bureau of Reclamation.
The Bureau of Land Management undertakes habitat restoration and preservation in the wetlands in partnership with the Colorado Division of Wildlife, United States Fish and Wildlife Service, United States Bureau of Reclamation, Ducks Unlimited, National Fish and Wildlife Foundation and other organizations.
The wetlands have been identified as an Area of Critical Environmental Concern.
They are closed to the public from mid-February to mid-July to avoid disturbing nesting birds.
At other times of the year the wetlands are open for activities such as fishing, waterfowl hunting and bird watching.

As of February 2012 the Bureau of Land Management was asking for input from the public on a proposal to expand the Blanca Wetlands Area of Critical Environmental Concern.

Wildlife

The wetlands is one of the most important areas for birds in Colorado since it provides habitat for migrating waterbirds or shorebirds.
It hosts thirteen threatened, endangered and sensitive species.
The bald eagle and the peregrine falcon use the wetlands.  
The snowy plover and the white-faced ibis have been documented as nesting.  
Other Species of Management Priority that have been documented are American bittern,  avocet, common yellowthroat, eared grebe, Forster's tern, greater sandhill crane, hen harrier, Savannah sparrow, snowy egret, sora rail, western grebe and yellow-headed blackbird.  
Shorebirds such as gulls, sandpipers and pelicans are at home in the salty environment, as well as 158 other species.
There is a breeding population of snowy plover.
The wetlands is a duck breeding concentration area, with mallards by far the most common, but good numbers of pintail and green-winged teal also visiting.

The wetlands could become critical for conserving amphibians in the valley.
There is a healthy population of Great Plains toads. Other documented amphibians include the plains spadefoot toad, western chorus frog, leopard frog and tiger salamander.  There are several species of bat in the wetlands.
The least chipmunk is common in the greasewood parks that adjoin the wetlands and the Ord's kangaroo rat lives in the sand dunes.
Muskrats and coyotes are present, and mule deer and elk are often seen in the wetland area.

Water supply

Some of the water from the Closed Basin Project, which mainly collects groundwater for irrigation in the Rio Grande valley, 
is delivered to the Blanca Wildlife Habitat Area. 
In 2006 the Habitat Area received .
In addition to this water they receive the output from over forty artesian wells.
A developer who was converting land irrigated by the Anderson Ditch no longer needed the water rights since they were converting their land to residential use.

The Bureau of Land Management is required to maintain "mitigation acres" to offset the impact of the Closed Basin Project.
In 2010 the Bureau of Land Management was reviewing plans for large-scale drying of the wetlands, coupled with irrigating the adjacent South San Luis Lakes to the north.
Drying is a management tool that mimics natural processes and supports crucial ecological processes such as plant succession and removal of salts from the system.
To do so on a large scale the water tables must be lowered enough to have the full effect.
The proposed area to be irrigated lies between the Blanca Wetlands ACEC and the San Luis State Park, and would allow species to migrate between wetlands in the state park and the Blanca wetlands.

References
Citations

Sources

 

Protected areas of Alamosa County, Colorado
Landforms of Alamosa County, Colorado
Wetlands of Colorado